Eteobalea dohrnii is a moth in the  family Cosmopterigidae. It is found in France, Spain, Portugal, Italy, Sardinia, Corsica, Sicily, Malta, Croatia, Greece, Crete and Cyprus. In the east, the range extends to Syria.

The wingspan is 10–14 mm. Adults are on wing from May to early October in two generations per year.

The larvae feed on Plantago albicans and probably other Plantago species.

References

Moths described in 1847
Eteobalea
Moths of Europe
Moths of Asia